Linn Nyrønning (born 4 June 1981) is a Norwegian football midfielder who currently plays for Trondheims-Ørn.

References
Profile at club site
National team statistics

1981 births
Living people
Norwegian women's footballers
Norway women's international footballers
SK Trondheims-Ørn players
Women's association football midfielders